Cytochrome b within both molecular and cell biology, is a protein found in the mitochondria of eukaryotic cells. It functions as part of the electron transport chain and is the main subunit of transmembrane cytochrome bc1 and b6f complexes.

Function 

In the mitochondrion of eukaryotes and in aerobic prokaryotes, cytochrome b is a component of respiratory chain complex III — also known as the bc1 complex or ubiquinol-cytochrome c reductase. In plant chloroplasts and cyanobacteria, there is an analogous protein, cytochrome b6, a component of the plastoquinone-plastocyanin reductase, also known as the b6f complex. These complexes are involved in electron transport, the pumping of protons to create a proton-motive force (PMF). This proton gradient is used for the generation of ATP. These complexes play a vital role in cells.

Structure 

Cytochrome b/b6 is an integral membrane protein of approximately 400 amino acid residues that probably has 8 transmembrane segments. In plants and cyanobacteria, cytochrome b6 consists of two protein subunits encoded by the petB and petD genes. Cytochrome b/b6 non-covalently binds two heme groups, known as b562 and b566. Four conserved histidine residues are postulated to be the ligands of the iron atoms of these two heme groups.

Use in phylogenetics 

Cytochrome b is commonly used as a region of mitochondrial DNA for determining phylogenetic relationships between organisms, due to its sequence variability.  It is considered to be most useful in determining relationships within families and genera.  Comparative studies involving cytochrome b have resulted in new classification schemes and have been used to assign newly described species to a genus as well as to deepen the understanding of evolutionary relationships.

Clinical significance 

Mutations in cytochrome b primarily result in exercise intolerance in human patients; though more rare, severe multi-system pathologies have also been reported.

Single-point mutations in cytochrome b of Plasmodium falciparum and P. berghei are associated with resistance to the anti-malarial drug atovaquone.

Human genes 

Human genes encoding cytochrome b proteins include:
 CYB5A – cytochrome b5 type A (microsomal)
 CYB5B – cytochrome b5 type B (outer mitochondrial membrane)
 CYBASC3 – cytochrome b, ascorbate dependent 3
 MT-CYB – mitochondrially encoded cytochrome b

Fungicide target
Cyt b is targeted by the QI class of fungicides, Fungicide Resistance Action Committee group 11. The cyt b mutations  and  provide resistance against the main body of group 11, although G143A does not work against metyltetraprole (11A). G143A is significant in Botrytis cinerea in California strawberry production.

References

External links 
 

Electron-transfer proteins
Protein domains
Protein families
Transmembrane proteins